The Blue Bird is a 1910 silent film, based on the 1908 play by Maurice Maeterlinck and starring Pauline Gilmer as Mytyl and Olive Walter as Tytyl.  It was filmed in England.

Cast (in credits order)
Pauline Gilmer as Mytyl
Olive Walter as Tytyl
Margaret Murray as Mummy Tyl
E.A. Warburton as Daddy Tyl
Ernest Hendrie as Tylo
Norma Page as Tylette
Carlotta Addison as The Fairy
Edward Rigby as Bread
H.R. Hignett as Sugar
Doris Lytton as Milk
Saba Raleigh as Cow
C. V. France as Time
Roy Travers as Cow

External links
 

1910 films
British films based on plays
British black-and-white films
British silent short films
Films based on works by Maurice Maeterlinck
Works based on The Blue Bird (play)